Henry Francis "Soapy" Vallence (4 June 1905 – 25 July 1991) was a champion Australian rules footballer in the Victorian Football League (VFL) and the Victorian Football Association (VFA).  He played at full forward for the VFL's Carlton Football Club in the 1930s, and in the 1940s for the VFA's Williamstown and Brighton Football Clubs.

Family
The son of Michael Vallence, and Mary Ann Vallence, née Pattinson, Henry Francis Vallence was born in Bacchus Marsh, Victoria on 4 June 1905.

He married Lorna Josephine Bliss (1915-1996) on 17 June 1940.

Football

Carlton (VFL)
Originally from Bacchus Marsh, in 1926 he came to Carlton as a half-forward.  He soon moved to full forward where he became known for his safe hands and mighty kick.  He kicked 11 goals in a match on four occasions – twice in finals.

Williamstown (VFA)
In 1937 he left Carlton to play with Williamstown Football Club in the Victorian Football Association as captain-coach.  His dispute with Carlton arising when he returned from representing Victoria in an interstate match to find himself selected at centre halfback in the seconds grade.

Carlton (VFL)
He was lured back to Carlton for the 1938 season, helping to secure the Blues first premiership in 23 years.

Williamstown (VFA)
Vallence returned again to Williamstown in 1939, this time playing under the Association's throw-pass rules adopted in 1938. In 1939, Vallence kicked 133 goals, and helped Williamstown to a premiership, and kicked another 111 goals in 1940. On 24 May 1941, Vallence achieved two significant milestones: he kicked a career-high twenty goals against Sandringham, and brought up his 1000th career goal across both the League and Association. His career with Williamstown ended after 1941, when the competition went into recess during World War II.

Carlton (VFL)
He was captain-coach of the Carlton Reserves for three seasons (1942-1944).

Brighton (VFA)
Vallence resumed playing after World War II as the captain-coach at Brighton, where he played his last game in 1946 (kicking 11 goals).

Vallence played 204 games and kicked 722 goals for Carlton in his career; the latter was a club record until broken by Stephen Kernahan in 1997. He scored a further 337 goals for Williamstown, 88 for Brighton, and 19 in representative games for Victoria, for a career total of 1166 goals.

Death
He died on 25 July 1991 of Alzheimer's disease in Geelong Hospital.

Recognition
In 1996 Vallence was inducted into the Australian Football Hall of Fame.

Footnotes

References 
 The Australian Encyclopaedia, v.4, Grollier, 1963, p. 140
 Soapy has them roaring again, The Argus, (Tuesday, 16 August 1955), p.18.

External links 
 
 Harry Vallence Profile in Blueseum
 Harry Vallence, at Boyles Football Photos.
 Harry 'Soapy' Vallence, at The VFA Project.
 AFL: Hall of Fame

1905 births
1991 deaths
People from Bacchus Marsh
Australian rules footballers from Victoria (Australia)
Australian Rules footballers: place kick exponents
Carlton Football Club players
Carlton Football Club Premiership players
Australian Football Hall of Fame inductees
Williamstown Football Club players
Williamstown Football Club coaches
Brighton Football Club players
Brighton Football Club coaches
VFL Leading Goalkicker Medal winners
Neurological disease deaths in Victoria (Australia)
Deaths from Alzheimer's disease
One-time VFL/AFL Premiership players